Force Motors Ltd is an Indian multinational automotive manufacturing company, based in Pune. From 1958 until 2005, the company was known as Bajaj Tempo Motors because it originated as a joint venture between Bachraj Trading Ltd and Germany's Tempo. The company is known for brands like the Tempo, Matador, Minidor and Traveller. Over the last five decades, it has partnered with global manufacturers such as Daimler, ZF, Bosch, VW, Traton and MAN.

Force Motors is India’s largest van maker.  The company is completely vertically integrated, making its own components for the entire product range. Force Motors has a nationwide dealer presence. The company also exports to various countries in Africa, Latin America, SAARC and ASEAN countries, Gulf and Germany.

Force Motors ranked 359th (2020) on the Fortune India 500 companies list.

History

Aside from manufacturing light transport vehicles, Force Motors also makes engines and axles, as well as a large variety of die-cast aluminium parts. The foundation of Bajaj Tempo originates with the Bachraj Trading company, which was established in 1945. Bachraj started assembling three-wheeled auto rickshaws and small trucks in 1951, under license from Tempo of Germany. In 1958 the companies announced the creation of a joint venture, called the Bajaj Tempo Motors, with 26 percent of the shares belonging to Tempo. In 1968 the Firodia Group took a majority stake in Bajaj Tempo.

In 1971 Tempo (Germany) passed into the hands of Daimler-Benz, who retained a 16.8 percent share in Bajaj Tempo until 2001. Daimler sold its stake in April 2001 after 43 years citing little synergy between the two companies.

The Tempo Matador was the first diesel light commercial vehicle in India. The company started production of the Hanseat 3-Wheelers in collaboration with Vidal & Sohn Tempo Werke Germany in 1958. The word Tempo (a registered trade mark of Daimler) is now generic for any small goods carrier in India.

In 1987, Force Motors set up a new plant at Pithampur in Madhya Pradesh, for the production of Tempo Traveller. This plant was designed and built to the specification of Daimler-Benz.

In 1997, Daimler asked it to set up a dedicated facility for assembling and testing engines for Mercedes passenger cars to be made in India.

In 2005 the company was renamed Force Motors.

Force Motors signed technology sourcing agreements in 2003 with MAN SE for which payments were made up front. On completion of the localization of the licensed technology and with the request from MAN, a joint venture was created forming MAN Force Trucks Pvt. Ltd to manufacture the full range of HCVs from 16t GVW to 49t GCW. MAN proceeded to buy out Force and MAN Trucks India was established as a separate concern in 2012.

In 2012, Force Motors launched Traveller 26, a monocoque panel van that can seat 26 persons, designed entirely in-house. It had disk brakes on all four wheels and also came with safety features like ABS and EBD.

In 2015, the company was awarded a contract by BMW, resulting in a new facility in Chennai which produces and test engines and transmissions exclusively for all BMW cars and SUVs made in India. This plant can produce up to 20,000 engines per year.

A new plant was inaugurated at Chakan, Pune in June 2016. This facility assembles and tests engines for all Mercedes Cars and SUVs made in India. The new plant has a current annual capacity of 20,000 engines and 20,000 front and rear axles.

In March 2018, Force Motors entered into a joint-venture agreement with Rolls-Royce Power Systems AG to manufacture in India and supply worldwide, the 10 and 12cylinder, Series 1600 engines (545 hp to 1050 hp) for power generation and under floor rail applications.

Products
Force Motors manufactures a range of vehicles including Small Commercial Vehicles (SCV), Light Commercial Vehicles (LCV), Multi Utility Vehicles (MUV), Special Cross Country Vehicles and Agricultural Tractors.

Light Commercial vehicles

 Force Traveller range of vehicles (including Traveller 26, School Bus, Ambulance, Quick Response Vehicle, Royale)
 Force Monobus
 Force Urbania
 Matador (Discontinued)

Small Commercial Vehicles

 Shaktiman 200
 Shaktiman 400
 Tempo Hanseat (Discontinued)
 Tempo Excel (Discontinued)
 Minidor (Discontinued)
Multi Utility Vehicles

 All-new Force Trax (including Toofan, Cruiser, Cruiser Deluxe)
 Kargo King Grand
 Trax Delivery Van
 Trax Ambulance
 Citiline
 Trax Gama (Discontinued)
 Tempo Trax Judo (Discontinued)
 Tempo Trax Pickup (Discontinued)

Agricultural vehicles

 Balwan tractors
 Orchard tractors
 Sanman Tractors
 Abhiman Tractors

Sports Utility Vehicles (SUVs)

 Force One SUV (Discontinued)
 Force Gurkha

References

External links
 

 
Truck manufacturers of India
Indian brands
Indian companies established in 1958
Vehicle manufacturing companies established in 1958
Car brands
1958 establishments in Bombay State
Companies listed on the National Stock Exchange of India
Companies listed on the Bombay Stock Exchange
Car manufacturers of India
Companies based in Pune